Coffee County Central High School is a public high school located in Manchester, Tennessee. The school serves about 1,600 students (9th graders included) in the Coffee County School District.

References

External links
Coffee County Central High School website

Schools in Coffee County, Tennessee
Public high schools in Tennessee
Manchester, Tennessee